Attore South (also known as Attore Road, is part of Kolazhy grama panchayat, in Puzhakkal block, in Thrissur taluk, in Thrissur district.

Attore South is also known by the name "Attore Road", because the road to Attore North passes by here.

Attore South is included in Pottore Census Town and served by Kuttur (Thrissur) post office, PIN 680013.

History
Present day Attore South, in ancient times, was just a road, that connected Attore angadi (Attore village) to Thrissur city. It was then part of Vijayapuram "pravrithi" in Trichur "taluq".

 
 
 
 

Oldest reference to the name "Attore" can be found in the 1788 publication "Memoir of a map of Hindoostan" by James Rennell.

References

Cities and towns in Thrissur district
Villages in Thrissur district